Joan Dotras i Vila (4 November 1900, in Barcelona – 15 July 1978, in Canet de Mar, Spanish: Juan Dotras Vila) was a Catalan composer and pedagogue. He was best known as a zarzuela composer. He taught at the Escuela Municipal de Música and the Liceo in Barcelona.

Works

Zarzuelas
 Kosmópolis: zarzuela en forma de magazine musical circense (1928)
 Romanza húngara: poema lírico en tres actos (1937)
 El caballero del amor (1939)
 La chica del topolino (1941)
 Verónica (1942)
 Aquella canción antigua (1952) libretto Federico Romero

References

People from Barcelona
1900 births
1978 deaths
Composers from Catalonia
Opera composers from Catalonia
Spanish opera composers
Male opera composers
20th-century classical composers
Spanish male classical composers
Spanish classical composers
20th-century Spanish musicians
20th-century Spanish male musicians